The Master of the Saint Augustine Altarpiece (sometimes called the Master of the Augustinians' Altarpiece) was a German painter active in Nuremberg during the second half of the 15th century.  His work indicates familiarity with the work of both Martin Schöngauer and the Master of the Housebook.

15th-century German painters
Saint Augustine Altarpiece, Master of the